Yingst is a surname.  According to the Dictionary of American Family Names (Oxford University Press, 2013), it is an Americanized form of the German Jüngst (youngest). The name is mostly of Pennsylvania German origin.

Notable people with the surname include:

Doug Yingst, American ice hockey executive
Maynard Yingst (1949–1993), American car racer
Trey Yingst, American journalist

Surnames of German origin